Kensham is a hamlet in Kent, between Rolvenden and Sandhurst.  In the medieval era it was called Cassingham.

Hamlets in Kent